Hevel Lakhish (lit. Lakhish Region) is an area of south-central Israel. Part of the southern Shephelah, it is located between the Judean Mountains and the Mediterranean Sea and is named after the Biblical city of Lachish.

History

In ancient times, the main road through the Lachish region  ran from the port city of Gaza through Gath, Lachish, Maresha, Azekah, the Elah Valley and the Ayalon Valley before turning east  through the Beit Horon Ascent, to the Hill Road and Jerusalem. A break-off road ran from Maresha to the Hill Road at Hebron.

Before the 1948 Arab-Israeli War, three kibbutzim were founded in the area - Gal On, Gat and Negba. Between 1955 and 1961 twenty more settlements were established. Lova Eliav was a driving force in the development of the region.

The area is covered by three regional councils - Lakhish, Shafir and Yoav - and one city council, Kiryat Gat. In the year 2009 70,200 people lived in the region, 100% of them Jews.

See also
Geography of Israel

References

Regions of Israel